The Stellat'en First Nation  is the band government of the Stellat'en subgroup of the Dakelh people in the Omineca Country of the Central Interior of British Columbia, Canada.

Chief and Councillors
As of March, 2022:
Chief:  Robert Michell
Councillor:  Yvonne George
Councillor:  Tannis Reynolds
Councillor:  Kenneth Schmidt
Councillor:  Walter Ward

Treaty Process
Stellat’en First Nation history 
(http://stellaten.ca/Portals/0/forms/timeline.pdf)
 
1700s

1807:  Simon Fraser wrote a letter detailing events he had witnessed in Stella. 

1821: Peter Skene Ogden was made chief trader of the Hudson's Bay Company.

1800s 

1857: Gradual Civilization Act.

1880: Father Morice and Father Coccola came to the Fraser Lake and Fort St. James area.

1885: Arrival of Father A.G. Maurice.

1892: The Fraser Lake Indians are officially recognized, and a reserve is created. Stellat’en First Nation and Nadleh Whut’en Band were put together as one band by the government.  

1900s 

1901: Provincial Government asks for a reduction of the number of reserves. 

1911: Barricade Treaty.

1958-60:  Stellaquo Indian Reserve separates from the Fraser Lake Indian Band  

1922-76:  Lejac Indian Residential school in operation 

1976: Lejac Residential School closed. 

1989: Stellaquo is recognized as 613 Ir. No 1 and Binta Lake as Ir. No 2.  

Band History Stellaten.ca timeline

Demographics
Number of Band Members: 613

Economic Development

Social, Educational and Cultural Programs and Facilities

References

Dakelh governments
Omineca Country